List of normal schools by country

This list is incomplete.  You can help Wikipedia by expanding it.

Canada 
 Edmonton Normal School
 New Brunswick Teachers' College (formerly "normal school")
 Nova Scotia Teachers College (formerly "normal school")
 Ottawa Normal School
 Regina Normal School
 Toronto Normal School
 See main article in Normal school under entry for Canada for complete list.

China

 北京师范大学 (Beijing Normal University)
 华东师范大学 (East China Normal University)
 天津师范大学 (Tianjin Normal University)
 上海师范大学 (Shanghai Normal University)
 重庆师范大学 (Chongqing Normal University)
 南京师范大学 (Nanjing Normal University)
 湖南师范大学 (Hunan Normal University)
 华中师范大学 (Huazhong Normal University)
 东北师范大学 (Northeast Normal University)
 长春师范大学 (Changchun Normal University)
 陕西师范大学（Shaanxi Normal University）
 首都师范大学 (Capital Normal University）
 华南师范大学 (South China Normal University)
 江西师范大学 (Jiangxi Normal University)
 安徽师范大学（Anhui Normal University）
 辽宁师范大学 (Liaoning Normal University)
 瀋陽師範大學 (Shenyang Normal University)
 云南师范大学 (Yunnan Normal University)
 新民师范学院 (Xinmin Normal College)
 韩山师范学院 (Hanshan Normal University)
 河南师范大学 (Henan Normal University)
 河北师范大学 (Hebei Normal University)
 伊犁师范大学 (Yili Normal University)

Taiwan 
In the province of Taiwan:
National Changhua University of Education
National Hsinchu University of Education
National Kaohsiung Normal University
National Taichung University (of Education)
National Tainan University College of Education
National Taipei University of Education
National Taiwan Normal University
Taipei Municipal University of Education

Colombia
 Gimnasio Moderno
 Chapinero's English Royal School

Finland
In Finland, every Faculty of Education has one or several normal schools to give aspiring teachers a chance for teaching practice as a part of their academic curriculum. The schools may, depending on the type of teachers educated, offer education for pupils in age groups 7–12, 13–19 or both. Administratively, the schools are part of their universities, but the pupils for the schools are accepted as to usual municipal schools. The academic curriculum followed by the pupils is the same as in all other schools of the same type, but the normal schools frequently engage in research programs which may necessitate minor curriculum alterations.
 Helsingin normaalilyseo, University of Helsinki
 Helsingin yliopiston Viikin normaalikoulu, University of Helsinki
 Hämeenlinnan normaalikoulu, University of Tampere
 Joensuun normaalikoulu, University of Joensuu
 Jyväskylän normaalikoulu, University of Jyväskylä
 Kajaanin normaalikoulu, University of Oulu
 Lapin yliopiston harjoittelukoulu, University of Lapland
 Oulun normaalikoulu, University of Oulu
 Rauman normaalikoulu, University of Turku
 Savonlinnan normaalikoulu, University of Joensuu
 Tampereen normaalikoulu, University of Tampere
 Turun normaalikoulu, University of Turku
 Vasa övningsskola, Swedish-speaking, Åbo Akademi

France
Ecole Normale

Italy
Scuola Normale Superiore di Pisa

Jamaica
Mico University College

Kenya
Strathmore School
The Green Gardens School
Consolata School
Kaaga Girls High School
St. Mary's School

Lithuania
 Lietuvos edukologijos universitetas Lithuanian University of Educational Sciences

Malaysia 
 Institut Pendidikan Guru Malaysia training teachers for primary schools in Malaysia. 
 Universiti Pendidikan Sultan Idris training teachers for secondary schools in Malaysia

Nigeria

Philippines

Adamson University College of Education
Arellano University School of Education
Cebu Normal University
Central Philippine University College of Education
De La Salle University College of Education
Leyte Normal University
National Teachers College
Pangasinan State University College of Teacher Education, Bayambang
Philippine Normal University
Polytechnic University of the Philippines College of Education
University of Santo Tomas College of Education
University of the Philippines College of Education
West Visayas State University College of Education

South Korea
 Cheju National University College of Education
 Chonbuk National University College of Education
 Chonnam National University College of Education
 Chungbuk National University College of Education
 Chungnam National University College of Education
 Gyeongsang National University College of Education
 Kangwon National University College of Education
 Kyungpook National University College of Education
 Pusan National University College of Education
 Seoul National University College of Education

United Kingdom
 Bangor Normal College
 Royal Normal College for the Blind

United States
 Alabama Agricultural and Mechanical University formerly State Normal and Industrial School
 Albion State Normal School closed 1951
 Arizona State University – Founded as Territorial Normal School. Later Arizona Territorial Normal School, Arizona Normal School, Normal School of Arizona, Tempe Normal School, Tempe State Teachers College, Arizona State Teachers College, and Arizona State College. ASU's teacher training program is now housed in its Mary Lou Fulton Teachers College.
 Bridgewater State College Formerly Bridgewater Normal School
 Ball State University, Teachers College
 Bowling Green State University, Bowling Green, Ohio Formerly Bowling Green State Normal School
 University of Central Missouri, Warrensburg, Missouri – Founded as State Normal School, Second District. Later Warrensburg Teachers College, Central Missouri State Normal School, Central Missouri State Teachers College, Central Missouri State College, and Central Missouri State University.
 University of Central Oklahoma Formerly Territorial Normal School, Central State Normal School, Central State Teacher's College, Central State College, Central State University
 Central Washington University, Ellensburg, Washington, Formerly Washington State Normal School
 Chadron State College, Chadron, Nebraska
 Concordia Normal School closed 1876
 Concord University, Athens, West Virginia – Founded in 1872 as Concord Branch of the State Normal School. Later known as Concord State Normal School, Concord State Teachers College, and Concord College.
 Teachers College, Columbia University
 Eastern Illinois University, Charleston, Illinois Formerly Eastern Illinois Normal School
 Eastern Kentucky University, Richmond, Kentucky – Founded as Eastern Kentucky State Normal School. Later Eastern Kentucky State Normal School and Teachers College, Eastern Kentucky Teachers College, and Eastern Kentucky State College. See also Model Laboratory School, a K-12 school operated by EKU as part of its teacher training program.
 Eastern Michigan University, Ypsilanti, Michigan Formerly Michigan State Normal School
 East Tennessee State University Formerly East Tennessee State Normal School
 Emporia State University, Emporia, Kansas Formerly Kansas Normal School and Emporia State Teachers College
 Fairmont State University, Fairmont, West Virginia – Founded as the private West Virginia Normal School. Soon taken over by the state and became a branch of the State Normal School of Marshall College (modern-day Marshall University). Later known as Fairmont Normal School, the Fairmont Branch of the West Virginia Normal School, the Branch of the West Virginia Normal School at Fairmont, Fairmont State Normal School, Fairmont State Teachers College, and Fairmont State College.
 Framingham State College Formerly State Normal School at Framingham and Framingham Normal School
 Georgia Southern University, Statesboro, Georgia – Founded in 1906 as a regional agricultural school, First District Agricultural & Mechanical School. Mission changed in 1924 to that of a normal school, with the school name changing to Georgia Normal School. Later South Georgia Teachers College, Georgia Teachers College, and Georgia Southern College.
 Harris-Stowe State University, St. Louis, Missouri – Formed as a merger of the historically white Harris Teachers College and the historically black Sumner Normal School, later Stowe Teachers College.
 Hunter College, CUNY - Founded as Female Normal and High School. Later Normal College of the City of New York.
 Indiana State University, Terre Haute, Indiana Formerly Indiana State Normal School
 Illinois State University, Normal, Illinois Formerly Illinois State Normal School
 James Madison University, Harrisonburg, Virginia – Founded as The State Normal and Industrial School for Women. Later The State Normal and Industrial School for Women at Harrisonburg, State Normal School for Women at Harrisonburg, State Teachers College at Harrisonburg, and Madison College.
 Kent State University, Kent, Ohio Formerly Kent State Normal School
 Leavenworth Normal School closed 1876
 Lewis-Clark State College Formerly Lewiston State Normal School in Lewiston, Idaho
 Longwood University, Farmville, Virginia – Founded as the Farmville Female Seminary Association. Became a college as Farmville Female College. Became the Normal School when taken over by the Commonwealth of Virginia. Later the State Normal School for Women at Farmville, State Teachers College at Farmville, and Longwood College.
 University of Mary Washington, Fredericksburg, Virginia – Founded as The State Normal and Industrial School for Women at Fredericksburg. Later Mary Washington College.
 University of Memphis, Memphis, Tennessee – Founded as West Tennessee Normal School. Later West Tennessee State Teachers College, Memphis State College, and Memphis State University.
 Minnesota State University Formerly Mankato State Normal School, Mankato State Teachers College, Mankato State College, and Mankato State University
 Missouri State University, Springfield, Missouri – Founded as Fourth District Normal School. Later Southwest Missouri State Teacher's College, Southwest Missouri State College, and Southwest Missouri State University.
 Montclair State University Formerly New Jersey State Normal School at Montclair
 Morehead State University, Morehead, Kentucky – Founded as Morehead Normal School. Later Morehead State Normal School and Teachers College, Morehead State Teachers College, and Morehead State College.
 Murray State University, Murray, Kentucky – Founded as Murray State Normal School. Later Murray State Normal School and Teachers College, Murray State Teachers College, and Murray State College.
the University of North Carolina at Greensboro - Founded as State Normal and Industrial School. Later State Normal and Industrial College, North Carolina College for Women, and Woman's College of the University of North Carolina.
 University of North Texas, Denton, Texas – Founded as Texas Normal College and Teacher Training Institute. Later North Texas State Normal College, North Texas State Teachers College, North Texas State College, and North Texas State University.
 Northeastern Illinois University Formerly Teacher Training School, The Normal School, Chicago Normal School, Chicago Teachers College, North Side Teachers College, Illinois Teachers' College North, and Northeastern Illinois State College
 University of Northern Colorado, College of Education & Behavioral Sciences Formerly The Colorado State Normal School, the Colorado Teacher's College, the Colorado State College of Education, and Colorado State College
 Northern Illinois University Formerly Northern Illinois State Normal School
 University of Northern Iowa, Formerly Iowa State Normal School and Iowa State Teachers College
 Northwest Missouri State University, Maryville, Missouri – Founded as Fifth District Normal School. Later Northwest Missouri State Teacher's College and Northwest Missouri State College.
 Northwestern State University Formerly Louisiana State Normal School, Louisiana State Normal College, and Northwestern State College of Louisiana
 Peru State College Formerly Nebraska State Normal School, Nebraska State Teachers College, and Peru State Teachers College
 Ohio Northern University Formerly Northwestern Ohio Normal School
 Peabody College of Education and Human Development, Vanderbilt University – Founded as Peabody Normal College in 1875 when the University of Nashville split into two institutions, a preparatory school and a standalone college. Soon became George Peabody College for Teachers and retained that name until merging with Vanderbilt in 1979.
 Radford University, Radford, Virginia – Formerly State Normal and Industrial School for Women at Radford and State Teachers College at Radford
 Rowan University Formerly Rowan College, Glassboro State College, New Jersey State Teachers College at Glassboro, and Glassboro Normal School  Founded in 1923
 Salina Normal University closed 1904
 San Diego State University, San Diego – Formerly San Diego Normal School
 San Jose State University Formerly Minns Evening Normal School, California State Normal School, California State Normal School at San Jose, California State Teachers College at San Jose, and San Jose State College
 Shepherd University, Shepherdstown, West Virginia – Founded in 1871 as Shepherd College, but converted to Shepherd Branch of the State Normal School the following year. Later known as Shepherd Teachers College and Shepherd College.
 Slippery Rock University Formerly Slippery Rock Normal School and Slippery Rock State Teachers College
 Sope Creek Elementary School (Marietta, Georgia)
 Southeast Missouri State University, Cape Girardeau, Missouri – Founded as Southeast Missouri State Normal School. Later Third District Normal School, Southeast Missouri State Teachers College, and Southeast Missouri State College.
 Southern Illinois University Carbondale, Carbondale, Illinois – Founded as Southern Illinois Normal College. Later Southern Illinois Normal College and Southern Illinois University. The city name was added when SIU opened a second campus in Edwardsville.
 State Normal School (Athens, Georgia)
 Texas State University, San Marcos, Texas – Founded as Southwest Texas State Normal School. Later Southwest Texas State Teachers College, Southwest Texas State College, Southwest Texas State University, and Texas State University-San Marcos.
 Towson University Formerly Maryland State Normal School, State Teachers College at Towson, Towson State College, and Towson State University
 Truman State University, Kirksville, Missouri – Formerly North Missouri Normal School, Northeast Missouri State University
 University of California, Los Angeles (UCLA) Formerly Los Angeles State Normal School
 Valley City State University Formerly Valley City State Teachers College, Valley City State College
 West Liberty University, West Liberty, West Virginia – Founded in 1837 as West Liberty Academy. Later converted to a normal school as West Liberty State Teachers College, and became West Liberty State College when it expanded to include liberal arts programs.
 Western Colorado University, Gunnison, Colorado – Founded as The Colorado State Normal School for Children. Later Western State College when it expanded to include liberal arts programs, and still later Western State Colorado University.
 Western Illinois University, Macomb, Illinois, Formerly Western Illinois State Normal School
 Western Kentucky University, Bowling Green, Kentucky – Founded as Glasgow Normal School. Later Southern Normal School and Business College, Western Kentucky State Normal School and Teachers College, Western Kentucky State Teachers College, and Western Kentucky State College.
 Western Michigan University, Kalamazoo, Michigan Formerly Western State Normal School
 Western Washington University Founded as New Whatcom State Normal School, then Washington State Normal School Bellingham, Woodring College of Education

Hong Kong
Hong Kong Institute of Education
Faculty of Education, The Chinese University of Hong Kong
Department of Education Studies, Faculty of Social Sciences, Hong Kong Baptist University
School of Education and Languages, Open University of Hong Kong
Faculty of Education, The University of Hong Kong

Vietnam
Trường Đại học Sư phạm Thành phố Hồ Chí Minh (Ho Chi Minh City Pedagogical University)
Trường Đại học Sư phạm Hà Nội (Hanoi National University of Education)
Trường Đại học Sư phạm Huế (Hue University of Education)

References